Nirupam Chakma is an Indian politician from Mizoram state in India. He represented Tuichawng in the Mizoram Legislative Assembly. Formerly a Congress minister, he joined Bharatiya Janata Party in 2015 and was offered ticket of Bharatiya Janata Party to the lone Lok Sabha seat of Mizoram in the last election held in 2019. He was the first Minister in Mizoram from Chakma Community.

Currently, he is the national President of Chakma National Council of India (CNCI).

Facebook Page:

References

External links
 Nirupam Chakma(Bharatiya Janata Party(BJP)):Constituency- MIZORAM(MIZORAM) - Affidavit Information of Candidate:

Bharatiya Janata Party politicians from Mizoram
Chakma people
Indian Buddhists
Living people
People from Mizoram
Mizoram MLAs 2008–2013
Former members of Indian National Congress
Year of birth missing (living people)